Liphyra grandis is a butterfly found in Papua New Guinea.

This species has a body length of 28 mm with a diameter of 7 mm. The length of the forewings is 45 mm. The body is dark brown, underside of same is brownish grey. The antennae have a length of 16 mm. The main coloration of the forewings is dark brown with a large reddish-yellow transversal line.

References

Gaede, M. (1925), Liphyra grandis und extensa. (Lep. Lycaen.), Deutsche entomologische Zeitschrift, 1925: 146

Miletinae
Butterflies described in 1902
Taxa named by Gustav Weymer
Endemic fauna of Papua New Guinea